LuxAnimation was a Luxembourgish animation studio based in Doncols, Luxembourg.

The company was founded in 2000 by  Lilian Eche and Ariane Payen. The company works with many companies to produce animated programs and movies. Since 2006, LuxAnimation has been owned by MoonScoop Group. In June 2010, LuxAnimation opened a department called Luxatelier, which dedicated to audiovisual projects for cinema and television. In 2014, Splash Entertainment owned MoonScoop Group and all its subsidiaries.

TV Show productions
 Potatoes and Dragons
 Robotboy (Season 1 only)
 Iron Man: Armored Adventures
 Cosmic Cowboys
 Galactik Football (Animation production, Season 1 only)
 Delta State
 Skyland
 Franklin (Season 6 only)
 Mikido the millennium kids
 The Klumpies
 Little Nick
 Little Spirou
 The Large Family (Season 1 only)
 Luke and Lucy
 Mikado (2007 TV Series)
 Moby Dick and the Secret of Mu
 Di-Gata Defenders
 Babar and the Adventures of Badou
 Zip & Saxo
 S.O.S. Libélula

Movies
 Black Heaven (2010) (VFX Only)
 Bypass (2012) (VFX Only)
 Daddy, I'm a Zombie (2011)
 Dragon Hunters (2008)
 Franklin and the Turtle Lake Treasure (2006)
 Friends Forever (2009)
 Luke and Lucy: The Texas Rangers (2009)
 Max & Co. (2007)
 The Prodigies (2011)
 9 (2009)
 Petit Potam (2001)
 Renart the Fox (2005)
 Renaissance (2006)
 Santa's Magic Crystal (2011)
 Titeuf: The Movie (2011)
 The True Story of Puss 'n Boots (2009)
 Tristan & Isolde (2002)
 Trouble at Timpetill (2008)

Video Games
 Torrente 3: The Protector (2005, PS2 & PC) (Cutscene Animation)
 Blade Kitten (2010, PS3) (opening cutscene)

Partnerships
 Cartoon Network
 France 2
 France 3
 Nelvana
 RAI
 TF1
 ZDF
 Telegael
 Disney
 and more

See also
 Robotboy
 Luke and Lucy: The Texas Rangers
 Iron Man: Armored Adventures

References

Mass media companies of Luxembourg
Mass media companies established in 2000
Mass media companies disestablished in 2014
Luxembourgian animation studios
Luxembourgian companies established in 2000